Yang Shuxing (born November 1962) is a Chinese engineer and professor at Beijing Institute of Technology. He is the chief engineer of the 203 Research Institute of China Ordnance Industries Group Corporation Limited.

Biography
Yang was born in Tangshan, Hebei, in November 1962. He secondary studied at Tangshan No.1 High School. He earned a bachelor's degree in 1984, a master's degree in 1987, and a doctor's degree in 1991, all from Beijing Institute of Technology. After graduation, he taught at the university, where he was appointed its vice-president in 2002.

Honours and awards
 2005 State Defense Science and Technology Award (Second Class)
 2005 State Defense Science and Technology Award (Second Class)
 2006 State Science and Technology Progress Award (First Class) 
 2007 State Defense Science and Technology Award (First Class) 
 January 2019 State Science and Technology Progress Award (First Class) 
 November 22, 2019 Member of the Chinese Academy of Engineering (CAE)

References

1962 births
Living people
People from Tangshan
Engineers from Hebei
Beijing Institute of Technology alumni
Academic staff of Beijing Institute of Technology
Members of the Chinese Academy of Engineering